Samandar is an Indian television series that was broadcast on the Doordarshan network from 1995 to 1996. The 25-episode series depicted members of the Indian Navy. It was produced by Wing Commander Anup Singh Bedi VSM (Ret.), supported by jatt musician/singer Col (Dr) Sultan Singh Malik from the Indian Army.

The cast included Bollywood and Indian television personalities such as Vineeta Malik, Samir Soni, Girish Malik, Aman Verma and others, with special appearances by real Indian Navy officers. The visuals included manoeuvres from and pictures of Indian Naval fleet.

Cast
 Vineeta Malik
 Samir Soni
 Girish Malik
 Aman Verma

Music 
The title song of the show "Samandar ki hasin lehron ke kaamil hukmaraan hain hum...", by composer/singer Col S S Malik. Malik sang the title number composed as martial music with a motivating beat. The title song took the TRP of Samandar to most popular list in 1995–96.

References 

4. “Bahut dinon ke baad” by Sultan Malik « Guftagu @ amolak.in"

5. MAXY-The Arjun astride the arrow.  "« Guftagu @ amolak.in"

External links 
 Samandar title song on YouTube
 

DD National original programming
Indian Armed Forces in fiction
1995 Indian television series debuts
1996 Indian television series endings